Justina Agatahi (born 15 August 1989) is a Nigerian judoka who competed in the women's U52kg category. She won  bronze medals at the 2007 All-Africa Games, 2008 African Judo Championships and a gold medal at the International Tournament Nabeul, Tunisia.

Sports career 
At the Africa Games 2007, held in Maputo, Mozambique. She won a bronze medal in the 52 kg event.

At the 2008 African Judo Championships in Agadir, Morocco, Agatahi competed again in the 52 kg event and won a bronze medal.

Still in 2008, she participated in the International Tournament Nabeul, Tunisia and won a gold medal in the women's U52kg.

References 

1989 births
Living people
Nigerian female judoka
Competitors at the 2007 All-Africa Games
African Games medalists in judo
African Games bronze medalists for Nigeria
20th-century Nigerian women
21st-century Nigerian women